A Model Life is a reality television series hosted by model Petra Němcová that was built off some of the challenges she faced early in her career. The series debuted on July 13, 2007, on TLC in the United States and ran for one season. It followed six young models from around the world as they moved to New York City and try to earn a modeling contract with NEXT Modeling. There were no weekly eliminations.

Cast 
The participants included Lucia Dvorská, Abigail Fox, Angelika Oatway, Beatrice Bererra da Fontoura, Michelle Godin, and Valerija "Valeria" Erokhina.

References

External links 
 

2000s American reality television series
2007 American television series debuts
2007 American television series endings
TLC (TV network) original programming
Modeling-themed reality television series